Jannie is a given name. Notable people with the name include:
Jannie Blackwell, American politician
Jannie Bornman (born 1980), South African rugby union player
Jannie Boshoff (born 1986), South African rugby union player
Jannie Chan, Singaporean businesswoman
Jannie de Beer (born 1971), South African rugby union player
Jannie de Groot (born 1930), Dutch swimmer
Jannie du Plessis (born 1982), South African rugby union player
Jannie Engelbrecht (born 1938), South African rugby union player
Jannie Habig, South African rally driver
Jannie Hansen (born 1963), Danish footballer
Jannie Mouton, South African billionaire
Jannie Salcedo (born 1988), Colombian cyclist
Jannie Sand (born 1980), Danish cyclist
Jannie Stander (born 1993), South African rugby union player
Jannie van Eyck-Vos (born 1936), Dutch javelin thrower and middle-distance runner

See also
Janny